Stealing The Covers is the seventh studio album by the punk band Teenage Bottlerocket. The album consists of cover versions of songs originally recorded by small, not very well known and often short-lived bands. Stealing The Covers was released by Fat Wreck Chords on CD and LP on July 14, 2017.

Track listing 
 "The Way I Know" (Varsity Weirdos) - 1:51
 "Back And Forth" (Hollywood Blondes) - 3:01
 "College Town" (Jüke) - 2:16
 "Don't Go" (The Scutches) - 2:30
 "Robocop Is A Halfbreed Sellout" (Sprocket Nova) - 2:33
 "No Hugging No Learning" (Head) - 1:09
 "Shit Fuck God Damn" (Artimus Maximus) - 0:35
 "Gay Parade" (The Gullibles) - 2:03
 "It Came From The Radio" (The Blendours) - 2:00
 "Alien Motion Technology" (The Mugwumps) - 1:42
 "Hat Nerd" (The Four Eyes) - 1:59
 "My Very Best" (The 20Belows) - 1:52
 "I Kill Butterflies" (Onion Flavored Rings) - 1:18
 "Why The Big Pause" (The Punchlines) - 1:30

Performers 
 Miguel Chen - bass
 Darren Chewka - drums
 Ray Carlisle - guitar, vocals
 Kody Templeman - guitar, vocals

References 

2017 albums
Fat Wreck Chords albums
Teenage Bottlerocket albums